Leptoseris is a genus of corals belonging to the family Agariciidae.

The genus has almost cosmopolitan distribution.

Species

Species:

Leptoseris alternans 
Leptoseris amitoriensis

References

Agariciidae
Scleractinia genera